Agios Athanasios (before 1926: , Tsegani;, Bulgarian/Macedonian: Чеган, Chegan) is a village in the Pella regional unit of Macedonia, Greece. The village is located north of Lake Vegoritida within the Vegoritida municipal unit which belongs to the municipality of Edessa.

History
In the book "Ethnographie des Vilayets d'Adrianople, de Monastir et de Salonique", published in Constantinople in 1878, that reflects the statistics of the male population in 1873, Tchegantche was noted as a village with 124 households and 547 Bulgarian inhabitants.

In 1900, Vasil Kanchov gathered and compiled statistics on demographics in the area and reported that the village of Chegan was inhabited by about 750 Bulgarian Christians.

In August 1916 Bulgarian and Serbian forces fought near the village during the Chegan Offensive.

References

Populated places in Pella (regional unit)
Edessa, Greece